The nine species in the genus Philander, commonly known as gray and black four-eyed opossums, are members of the order Didelphimorphia. Mature females have a well-developed marsupium. The tail appears to be hairless except for the proximal (closest to the body) 5 or 6 cm, which has a few long hairs. The tail is slightly longer than the head-and-body length, and it is black for the proximal one half to two thirds of its length. The genus is closely related to Didelphis but the species of Philander are smaller than those of Didelphis. The genus formerly included [[brown four-eyed opossum|Metachirus nudicaudatus]], but this species lacks a pouch and so is now considered a separate genus. The common name comes from the white spots above the eyes, which can appear from a distance to be another set of eyes.

 Species Philander andersoni - Anderson's four-eyed opossumPhilander canus - Common four-eyed opossumPhilander deltae - Deltaic four-eyed opossumPhilander frenatus - Southeastern four-eyed opossumPhilander mcilhennyi - McIlhenny's four-eyed opossumPhilander melanurus - Dark four-eyed opossumPhilander mondolfii - Mondolfi's four-eyed opossumPhilander nigratus - Black four-eyed opossumPhilander olrogi - Olrog's four-eyed opossumPhilander opossum - Gray four-eyed opossumPhilander pebas - Pebas four-eyed opossumPhilander quica - Southern four-eyed opossumPhilander vossi'' - Northern four-eyed opossum

References

Opossums
Taxa named by Mathurin Jacques Brisson